Events from the year 1444 in France

Incumbents
 Monarch – Charles VII

Events
 22 May - Treaty of Tours signed between England and France who agree to a five-year truce in the Hundred Years War
 26 August - French troops fight the Battle of St. Jakob an der Birs against the Old Swiss Confederacy

References

1440s in France